Gosaihat is a village in Kamrup rural district, in the state of Assam, India, situated in south bank of river Brahmaputra.

Transport
The village is located south of National Highway 31 and connected to nearby towns and cities like Bijoynagar and Guwahati with regular buses and other modes of transportation.

See also
 Gurmou
 Gohalkona this village have unique and smarts Bodo people live since.300 years before there

References

Villages in Kamrup district